The autoepistemic logic is a formal logic for the representation and reasoning of knowledge about knowledge. While propositional logic can only express facts, autoepistemic logic can express knowledge and lack of knowledge about facts.

The stable model semantics, which is used to give a semantics to logic programming with negation as failure, can be seen as a simplified form of autoepistemic logic.

Syntax

The syntax of autoepistemic logic extends that of propositional logic by a modal operator  indicating knowledge: if  is a formula,  indicates that  is known. As a result,  indicates that  is known and  indicates that  is not known.

This syntax is used for allowing reasoning based on knowledge of facts. For example,  means that  is assumed false if it is not known to be true. This is a form of negation as failure.

Semantics

The semantics of autoepistemic logic is based on the expansions of a theory, which have a role similar to models in propositional logic. While a propositional model specifies which axioms are true or false, an expansion specifies which formulae  are true and which ones are false. This distinction allows  to be treated as a propositional formula, as all its subformulae containing  are either true or false. In particular, checking whether  entails  in this condition can be done using the rules of the propositional calculus. In order for an initial assumption to be an expansion, it must be that a subformula  is entailed if and only if  has been initially assumed true.

Therefore, there are only two candidate expansions, assuming it true or false, respectively. The check for them being actual expansions is as follows.

This result confirms the assumption implicit in  being false, that is, that  is not currently known. Therefore, the assumption that  is false is an expansion.

 is true : together with this assumption,  entails ; therefore, the initial assumption that is implicit in  being true, i.e., that  is known to be true, is satisfied. As a result, this is another expansion.

The second one has been regarded as unintuitive, as the initial assumption that  is true is the only reason why  is true, which confirms the assumption. In other words, this is a self-supporting assumption. A logic allowing such a self-support of beliefs is called not strongly grounded to differentiate them from strongly grounded logics, in which self-support is not possible. Strongly grounded variants of autoepistemic logic exist.

Generalizations
In uncertain inference, the known/unknown duality of truth values is replaced by a degree of certainty of a fact or deduction; certainty may vary from 0 (completely uncertain/unknown) to 1 (certain/known). In probabilistic logic networks, truth values are also given a probabilistic interpretation (i.e. truth values may be uncertain, and, even if almost certain, they may still be "probably" true (or false).)

See also
 Non-monotonic logic
 Modal logic

Notes

References

Logic programming
Modal logic